Grunge is a village in Vinje Municipality in Vestfold og Telemark county, Norway. The European route E134 highway runs through the village. Grunge Church is located a short distance west of the village.

References

Vinje
Villages in Vestfold og Telemark